Key-Thomas Märkl (born May 19, 1963) is a German-Japanese violinist and music educator.

Biography 
Märkl began learning the violin at the age of five with his father, Josef Märkl. His brother Jun Märkl is a noted conductor. 
Among his solo recordings are Stradivaris Gift (Monarda), The Secret Box (Zimmermann Frankfurt)  Stringsong (Latham Music).
He is married to the writer, composer and producer Kim Märkl.

Pedagogue 
Key Märkl is currently holding the position of Assistant to Ingolf Turban at the Conservatory for Music in Munich, as well as giving Master Classes in Japan.

References 

Japanese violinists
German male violinists
1963 births
Living people
21st-century violinists
21st-century German male musicians